Vanitha Krishnachandran is an Indian film and television actress. She acted during the 1980s in nearly 170 films in Malayalam, Tamil, Kannada and Telugu films along with several Malayalam and Tamil Television serials.

Personal life
Vanitha was born to Ganeshan and Kamala as the youngest of four children at Tiruchirappalli, Tamil Nadu. Her father is from Manjeri, Kerala, whose paternal ancestors originally hail from Tamil Nadu and her mother is from Tiruchirappalli. She was originally named Sai Vanitha, since her parents were huge devotees of the Indian guru Sathya Sai Baba. She has two elder sisters, Sai Prashanthi and Sai Jayalakshmi and an elder brother, Sai Ram. She had her primary education from RSK Higher Secondary School, Tiruchirappalli. She stopped studies after tenth grade since she became busy with movies by then.

She married Malayalam actor and singer Krishnachandran on 11 May 1986 with whom she had starred in Eenadu, Vanithapolice, Belt Mathai, Deeparadhana and a few other films.

Career
Vanitha entered the film industry as a 13-year-old and her debut film was Padai Maarinal directed by national award-winning director Durai, in 1979 in which she played a school girl. She played the lead role in her first Malayalam film, Chandrabimbam and became popular among Malayalis with her roles in Eenadu, Kaikeyi, and Enickum Oru Divasum. She acted opposite Mammooty and Mohanlal, in 'Vikatakavi and Chakravalam Chuvannappol, respectively. She said "I worked round-the-clock in Tamil, Telugu, Malayalam and Kannada films" and "cut down my assignments following my marriage". The last film she did before marriage was Kalyana Agathigal which was her 100th film.

In 2001, In Tamil, she made a comeback with a negative role in K. Balachander's television serial Kaalmulaitha Aasai. She has continued to act in serials in Tamil, such as Alaigal, and Kolangal, and in Malayalam. She portrayed Jalaja teacher in K. K. Rajeev's serial Amma Manasu  and has said that it was the real break in her second innings. She also played the role of a mother in Tamil films like Kana Kandaen, Kalabha Kadhalan and Parijatham and in many Malayalam films.

Partial filmography

Tamil

 Padhai Maarinal (1979)
 Adukku Malli (1979)
 Sujatha (1980)
 Nenjathai Killathe (1980) as Ramya
 Kaadu (1980)
 Malargale Malarungal (1980)
 Nandri Karangal (1980)
 Malargindra Paruvathile (1980)
 Neer Nilam Neruppu (1980)
 Panam Penn Paasam (1980)
 Porkkaalam (1980)
 Oli Pirandhathu (1980) as Poongavanam
 Andhi Mayakkam (1981)
 Anjatha Nenjangal (1981)
 Vasantha Kaalam (1981) as Kala
 Madhu Malar (1981)
 Keezh Vaanam Sivakkum (1981)
 Nandu (1981) as Uma
 Kazhugu (1981) as Vasanthi
 Simla Special (1981) as Sri Sri
 Nandu (1981) as Uma
 Parvaiyin Marupakkam (1982)
 Ayiram Muthangal (1982)
 Kanne Radha (1982) as Geetha
 Vedikkai Manidhargal (1982)
 Amma (1982)
 Thunai (1982)
 Vadivangal (1982)
 Vetri Namedhe (1982) as Rani
 Auto Raja (1982) as Shanthi
 Echchil Iravugal (1982)
 Adhisayappiravigal (1982)
 Theerpugal Thiruththapadalam (1982) as Kamini
 Asthivaram (1982)
 Antha Rathirikku Satchi Illai (1982)
 Rani Theni (1982) as Kanagam
 Nandri, Meendum Varuga (1982) as herself
 Punitha Malar (1982) as Vanitha
 Nenjil Oru Ragam (1982)
 Anal Kaatru (1983)
 Yugu Dharmam (1983)
 Bramacharigal (1983)
 Muthu Engal Sothu (1983)
 Thalaimagan (1983)
 Thudikkum Karangal (1983) as Stella
 Anney Anney (1983)
 Soora Puli (1983)
 Seerum Singangal (1983)
 Unmaigal (1983)
 Poikkal Kudhirai (1983) as Guest role
 Oorukku upadesam (1984)
 Pei Veedu (1984)
 Nyayam (1984)
 Sukra Desai (1984)
 Vai Sollil Veeranadi (1984)
 Neengal Kettavai (1984)
 Ambigai Neril Vanthaal (1984)
 Aalaya Deepam (1984)
 Unga Veetu Pillai (1984) as Sujatha
 Priyamudan Prabhu (1984)
 Pillaiyar (1984)
 Vai Pandal (1984)
 Pudhu Yugam (1985) 
 Raman Sreeraman (1985) as Saradha
 Sivappu Nila (1985)
 Veli (1985)
 Vetrikani (1985)
 Mookanankayiru (1985)
 Porutham (1985)
 Chain Jayapal (1985)
 Ammavum Neeye Appavum Neeye (1985)
 Raja Rishi (1985) as Ammani
 Police Police (1985)
 Kalyana Agathigal (1985) as Yeshodha
 En Selvame (1985) 
 Kulirkaala Megangal (1986)
 Oru Manithan Oru Manaivi (1986)
 Naan Adimai Illai (1986)
 Anjatha Singam (1986)
 Student Number 1 (2003) as Sibi's mother
 Anbe Anbe (2003) as Vishali's mother
 Arul (2004) as Arul's sister in law
 Gomathi Nayagam  (2004) as Thangam
 Loves  (2004) as Hari's mother
 Kana Kandaen (2005) as Archana's mother
 Kundakka Mandakka (2005) as Roopa's mother
 Kalabha Kadhalan (2006) as Anbarasi's mother
 Parijatham (2006) as Subhathra's mother
 Yaaradi Nee Mohini (2008) as Godavari
 Sandai (2008) as  Kathiresan's aunt
 Chikku Bukku (2010) as Meena's mother
 Kalloori Kalangal (2010) as Santhosh's mother
 Mudhal Kadhal Mazhai (2010) as  Aanjaneyar Kumar's mother
 Ko (2011) as Ashwin's mother
 Bhavani (2011) as Deepa's mother
 Manam Kothi Paravai (2012) as Thirumathi
 Kanna Laddu Thinna Aasaiya (2013) as Shiva's mother
 Desingu Raja (2013) as Thamarai's mother
 Idhu Kathirvelan Kadhal (2014) as Pavithra' mother
 Brahman (2014) as Siva's mother
 Vellaikaara Durai (2014) as Murugan's mother
 Thottal Vidathu (2014)
 Kirumi (2015) as Anitha's mother
 Ore Oru Raja Mokkaraja  (2015) as Ananthavalli
 Nambiar (2016) as Ramachandran's mother
 Meendum Oru Kadhal Kadhai (2016) as Vinod's mother
Mapla Singam (2016) as Sailaja's mother

Malayalam

 Chandrahasam (1980) as Sreedevi
 Chandra Bimbam (1980) as Mini
 Shalini Ente Koottukari (1980) as Shalini's sister
 Guha (1981) as Kamala
 Aadharsam (1982) as Simmy
 Enikkum Oru Divasam (1982) as Swapna
 Innalenkil Nale (1982) as Rekha
 Ee Nadu (1982) as Radha
 Velicham Vitharunna Penkutty as Vanitha
 Belt Mathai (1983) as Amina
 Oru Madapravinte Katha (1983) as Malathi
 Mouna Ragam (1983)
 Professor Janaki (1983)
 Deeparadhana (1983) as Janu
 Kaikeyi (1983) 
 Aadhipathyam (1983) as Kanam
 Chakravalam Chuvannappol (1983) as Prabha
 Vikatakavi (1984) as Nabeesa
 Vanitha Police (1984) as Ratnamma
 Oru Sumangaliyude Kadha (1984) as Kalyani
 Nayakan (1985) as Heroine
 Aazhikkoru Muthu (1989) as Jaya
 Sargavasantham (1995)
 Basket (2002) as Siva
 Nottam (2006) as Vishnu's mother
 Chocolate (2007) as Vanaja
 Rock & Roll (2007) as Chandramouli's mother
Minnaminnikoottam (2008) as Rosemary's mother
 Innathe Chintha Vishayam (2008) as Kamala's mother
 Mulla (2008) as Lachi's mother
 Sagar Alias Jacky Reloaded (2009) as Azar's mother
 Bhagyadevatha (2009) as Rosy
 Bhakthajanangalude Sradhakku (2011) as Viswanathan's mother
 Orkut Oru Ormakoot (2012) 
 Thalsamayam Oru Penkutty (2012) as Suryan's mother
 Thattathin Marayathu (2012) as Vinod's mother
 Perinoru Makan (2012) as Thulasi
 101 Weddings (2012) as Malathi
 Vaadhyar (2012) as Anoop's mother
 Chapters (2012) as Krishna Kumar's mother
 I Love Me (2012) as Xavi's mother
 3 Dots (2013) as Padmakumar's wife
 72 Model (2013) as Saajan's mother
 Omega.exe (2013) 
 Ravu (2013) 
 Vishudhan (2013) as Sunny's mother
 Artist (2013) as Gayatri's mother
 Neelakasham Pachakadal Chuvanna Bhoomi (2013) as Azma
 Memories (2013) as Marykutty
 How Old Are You (2014) as Nirupama's mother
 Pianist (2014) as Manu's mother
 Mili (2015) as Sudha
 Oru Second Class Yathra (2015) as Indira
 Monsoon (2015) as Anaas's mother
 Urumbukal urangarilla (2015) as Ratha
 Kali (2016) as Anjali's mother
 Pa Va (2016) as Elamma
 Inspector Dawood Ibrahim (2016) as Dawood Ibrahim's mother
 Kadamkatha (2017) as Sudha
 Kammara Sambhavam (2018) as Gomathi
 Thobama (2018) as Shanthi
 Brother's Day  (2019) as Mother Superior
 Jayadurga (Devotional album) 
 Neeravam (2021)
 Vaashi (2022) as Ebin's mother
 Aanandham Paramaanandham (2022)
 Ambalamukkile Visheshangal as Girijakumari

Telugu
 Bunny (2005)
  Bhavani IPS (2011) as Deepa's mother

Kannada
 Dharma (1985)

Television serials

Other TV Shows
 JB Junction
 Tharapakittu
 Red Carpet
 Manassiloru Mazhavillu
 Lakshmi Jewellery - advertismenet

Awards

Asiavision Television Awards 2012 - Best Character Actress - Kumkumapoovu
Asianet Television Award for Best Actress (Character) 2006 - Best Character Actress - Ammamanassu
Drishya Television Award for Best Actress (Character) 2006 - Best Character Actress - Ammamanassu

References

External links

Vanitha Krishnachandran on Moviebuff

Actresses in Malayalam cinema
Indian film actresses
Actresses in Tamil cinema
Actresses in Kannada cinema
Actresses in Telugu cinema
Actresses from Tiruchirappalli
Tamil comedians
Indian women comedians
Indian soap opera actresses
Actresses in Malayalam television
Actresses in Tamil television
Indian television actresses
20th-century Indian actresses
21st-century Indian actresses
Year of birth missing (living people)
Living people